The 563rd Flying Training Squadron (also 563d Flying Training Squadron) is an inactive United States Air Force unit.  It was part of the 12th Flying Training Wing at Randolph Air Force Base, Texas, where it operated the Boeing T-43 Bobcat conducting navigator training until inactivating on 19 November 2010.

The squadron was originally activated during World War II as the 563d Bombardment Squadron.  After training in the United States, it deployed to the European Theater of Operations, where it participated in the strategic bombing campaign against Germany.  The squadron was twice awarded the Distinguished Unit Citation for its combat actions.  Following V-E Day, it returned to the United States and was inactivated.  The squadron was briefly active in the reserve in the late 1940s, but does not appear to have been fully manned or equipped.

The squadron was redesignated the 563d Fighter-Bomber Squadron and activated in 1953.  It moved to Europe, but was inactivated in 1957, when it was replaced by another unit.   It was activated again as the 563d Tactical Fighter Squadron in 1962.  It conducted frequent deployments, but focused on training pilots for operations in Southeast Asia.  Elements of the squadron participated in combat there, although the squadron remained in the United States.  From 1973, it conducted Wild Weasel training.  It deployed elements for Desert Storm before inactivating in 1992.

History

World War II

Initial training and deployment
The 563d was first activated as the 563d Bombardment Squadron at Gowen Field, Idaho, one of the four original squadrons of the 388th Bombardment Group, in December 1942. The cadre that formed at Gowen moved to Wendover Field, Utah in February 1943, where the unit was fully manned and squadron training with Boeing B-17 Flying Fortress heavy bombers began. Training continued until June 1943, when it deployed to England.

Combat in Europe

The squadron assembled at RAF Knettishall, its combat station, and flew its first combat mission on 17 July, when it attacked an aircraft factory in Amsterdam.  The squadron primarily engaged in the strategic bombing campaign against Germany, attacking industrial sites, oil refineries and storage facilities, communications centers and naval targets on the European Continent.

The squadron was awarded a Distinguished Unit Citation (DUC) for attacking an aircraft factory at Regensburg, Germany, on 17 August 1943, withstanding heavy resistance to reach the target.  It was awarded a second DUC for three separate missions: an earlier attack on a tire and rubber factory in Hanover, Germany on 26 July 1943 and two missions in 1944, one against synthetic oil refineries near Brüx, Germany on 12 May and at Ruhland, Germany on 21 June. This last attack was on a shuttle bombing mission from England to Germany to Poltava, USSR, to Foggia, Italy, and back to England.  Other strategic targets included aircraft factories at Brunswick, Kassel, and Reims; airfields at Paris, Berlin and in Bordeaux; naval installations at Emden, Kiel and La Pallice, chemical works in Ludwigshafen; ball bearing factories at Schweinfurt and rail marshalling yards in Bielefeld, Brussels, and Osnabruck.

The squadron was occasionally diverted from the strategic campaign to perform air support and air interdiction missions.  It attacked military installations in France in early 1944 to help prepare the way for Operation Overlord, the invasion of Normandy, and on D Day hit coastal defenses, artillery batteries and transportation targets.  It attacked troop concentrations and supply depots.  In July 1944, it supported Operation Cobra at Saint Lo and the following month attacked targets in Caen.  It struck military installations and airfields near Arnhem during Operation Market Garden, the unsuccessful attempt to secure a bridgehead across the Rhine in the Netherlands.  It attacked transportation targets to support the final drive through Germany in early 1945.

Return and inactivation
The squadron flew its last combat mission in April 1945.  After V-E Day, the squadron flew missions to the Netherlands to drop food in flooded areas.  It then began redeploying to the United States.  Its aircraft left Knettishall between 9 June and 5 July 1945.  The ground echelon sailed again on the Queen Elizabeth on 5 August.  The squadron inactivated at Sioux Falls Army Air Field, South Dakota on 28 August 1945.

Air Force reserve
The squadron was activated in the reserves at Orchard Place Airport, Illinois on 12 June 1947 and assigned to the 338th Bombardment Group.    The squadron trained under the supervision of Air Defense Command (ADC)'s 141st AAF Base Unit (Reserve Training) (later the 2471st Air Force Reserve Flying Training Center), although it does not appear that it was fully manned or equipped.  Although nominally a bombardment unit, the squadron was equipped with North American AT-6 Texan and Beechcraft AT-11 Kansan trainers.

In July 1948 Continental Air Command (ConAC) assumed responsibility for managing reserve and Air National Guard units from ADC.  In 1949, the 563nd began to fly a few Curtiss C-46 Commando and Douglas C-47 Skytrain troop carriers and Douglas B-26 Invader light bombers, but it was inactivated in June when ConAC reorganized its reserve units under the wing base organization system.  President Truman's reduced 1949 defense budget also required reductions in the number of units in the Air Force, At O'Hare, the 338th Group and its squadrons were inactivated, and most of its personnel transferred to the 437th Troop Carrier Wing.

Fighter operations in Europe

The squadron was redesignated the 563d Fighter-Bomber Squadron and activated at Clovis Air Force Base, New Mexico in November 1953.  The squadron was equipped with North American F-86F Sabres, with a capability of carrying nuclear weapons.  A year after activation, in November 1954, the squadron was transferred to United States Air Forces Europe and departed, along with other elements of the 388th Fighter-Bomber Wing, for Étain-Rouvres Air Base, France.  However, construction at Etain was not far enough advanced to permit it to accept fighter aircraft, and only the wing headquarters settled in to the base.  Instead, the squadron ferried their Sabres to Bitburg Air Base, Germany, arriving the following month.

Little flying was done in the squadron's first winter in Europe due to weather.  It deployed to Wheelus Air Base, Libya in April 1955, where it was able to train in gunnery and bombing for the first time since arriving in Europe.  The squadron rejoined the wing at its permanent base in France in July 1955, the first of the wing's squadrons to arrive.  Starting in November 1955, it began deployments to Detachment 1 of the 388th Wing at Hahn Air Base, Germany to stand nuclear alert.  The detachment moved to Spangdahlem Air Base, Germany in February 1956.

The unit flew support for the Suez Canal and Hungarian crises.  In August 1956, the squadron began training to convert to the North American F-100 Super Sabre.  The conversion was completed by 2 April 1957.  However, the squadron flew the "Hun" for less than a year.  On 10 December 1957, the 49th Fighter-Bomber Wing moved from Japan on paper to replace the 388th Wing,  The 563d was inactivated and its mission, personnel and aircraft transferred to the 9th Fighter-Bomber Squadron.

F-105 fighter operations

The squadron was redesignated the 563d Tactical Fighter Squadron, organized at McConnell Air Force Base, Kansas in October 1962 and assigned to the 388th Tactical Fighter Wing.  The 563d was equipped with the Republic F-105 Thunderchief, although it initially flew F-100s as well until becoming an all Thunderchief unit.  In February 1964, the 388th was replaced at McConnell by the 23d Tactical Fighter Wing.  The squadron conducted tactical operations and training in preparation for global deployment.  In April 1965, the 563d deployed to Takhli Royal Thai Air Force Base, Thailand, where it participated in combat operations in the Vietnam War under the control of the 6235th Tactical Fighter Wing    On 27 July 1965, the unit participated in the first destruction of a surface-to-air missile site in North Vietnam in Operation Iron Hand.  It participated in the first increment of Operation Rolling Thunder, and in several attempts to destroy the Thanh Hoa and Paul Doumer Bridges.

The squadron returned to McConnell after earning two Air Force Outstanding Unit Awards with Combat "V" Device during its combat tour in Thailand.  It had flown more than 1500 sorties over North Vietnam and Laos and lost ten of the F-105Ds it originally deployed with.  Two squadron pilots were killed in action and three became Prisoners of War.  In 1966, the squadron focused on training replacement F-105 pilots for units in Southeast Asia.  It continued this mission until August 1970, when the need for "Thud Drivers" diminished with the withdrawal of the United States from Southeast Asia.  The squadron continued to fly the F-105 until inactivated in July 1972.

Wild Weasel

On 31 July 1975, the 563rd was again activated at George Air Force Base, California as the 563d Tactical Fighter Training Squadron and assigned to the 35th Tactical Fighter Wing.  It initially flew Thunderstick II aircraft but replaced them with McDonnell F-4 Phantom IIs in September 1975.  In October 1978, the 563rd received new aircraft from Nellis Air Force Base, Nevada, and was the first operational squadron to fly the advanced F-4G Wild Weasel.  The unit served with this electronic warfare aircraft in many exercises until it was inactivated in October 1989.

Flying training
On 14 May 1993, the 563rd was redesigned the 563d Flying Training Squadron and activated at Randolph Air Force Base, Texas.  The squadron was assigned to the 12th Flying Training Wing under Air Education and Training Command.  In conjunction with the 562nd Flying Training Squadron, it operated the Boeing T-43 Bobcat aircraft conducting electronic warfare officer and combat systems officer training in electronic attack, threat reaction, and electronic surveillance. The 563rd also operated the T-25 Simulator.  In 1996, its mission transferred to Pensacola Naval Air Station and Corry Station, Florida as the Air Force and the Navy combined their training activities and the squadron was inactivated in June 1996.  The Air Force resumed training electronic warfare officers in 1999 and the squadron was reactivated in April.  This training moved again to Pensacola and became the responsibility of the 479th Flying Training Group and the squadron was inactivated in November 2010.

Lineage
 Constituted as the 563rd Bombardment Squadron (Heavy) on 19 December 1942
 Activated on 24 December 1942
 Redesignated 563rd Bombardment Squadron, Heavy on 20 August 1943
 Inactivated on 28 August 1945
 Redesignated 563rd Bombardment Squadron, Very Heavy on 5 May 1947
 Activated in the reserve on 12 June 1947
 Inactivated on 27 June 1949
 Redesignated 563rd Fighter-Bomber Squadron on 5 November 1953
 Activated on 23 November 1953
 Inactivated on 10 December 1957
 Redesignated 563rd Tactical Fighter Squadron and activated on 1 May 1962 (not organized)
 Organized on 1 October 1962
 Inactivated on 31 July 1972
 Redesignated 563rd Tactical Fighter Training Squadron on 15 July 1975
 Activated on 31 July 1975
 Redesignated 563rd Tactical Fighter Squadron on 1 July 1977
 Inactivated on 5 October 1989
 Redesignated 563rd Flying Training Squadron on 14 December 1992
 Activated on 14 May 1993
 Inactivated on 3 June 1996
 Activated on 30 April 1999
 Inactivated on 19 November 2010

Assignments

 388th Bombardment Group, 24 December 1942 – 28 August 1945
 338th Bombardment Group, 12 June 1947 – 27 June 1949
 388th Fighter-Bomber Group, 23 November 1953 – 10 December 1957 (attached to 388th Fighter-Bomber Wing after 1 July 1957)
 Tactical Air Command, 1 May 1962 (not organized)
 388th Tactical Fighter Wing, 1 October 1962
 23rd Tactical Fighter Wing, 8 February 1964 (attached to 2nd Air Division, 8–9 April 1965; 6235th Tactical Fighter Wing [Provisional], 10 April-15 August 1965)
 832nd Air Division, 1–31 July 1972
 35th Tactical Fighter Wing, 31 July 1975
 37th Tactical Fighter Wing, 30 March 1981 – 5 October 1989
 12th Operations Group, 14 May 1993 – 3 June 1996
 12th Operations Group, 30 April 1999 – 19 November 2010

Stations

 Gowen Field, Idaho, 24 December 1942
 Wendover Field, Utah, c. 1 February 1943
 Sioux City Army Air Base, Iowa, 1 May-7 June 1943
 RAF Knettishall (AAF-136), England, June 1943 – c. 6 August 1945
 Sioux Falls Army Air Field, South Dakota, c. 13–28 August 1945
 Orchard Place Airport, Illinois, 12 June 1947 – 27 June 1949
 Clovis Air Force Base, New Mexico, 23 November 1953 – 28 November 1954
 Bitburg Air Base, Germany, 12 December 1954
 Étain-Rouvres Air Base, France, 7 July 1955 – 10 December 1957
 McConnell Air Force Base, Kansas, 1 October 1962 – 31 July 1972 (deployed to Takhli Royal Thai Air Force Base, Thailand 8 April-15 August 1965; Eglin Air Force Base, Florida 22 April-3 June 1971)
 George Air Force Base, California, 31 July 1975 – 5 October 1989.
 Randolph Air Force Base, Texas, 14 May 1993 – 3 June 1996
 Randolph Air Force Base, Texas, 30 April 1999 - 19 November 2010

Aircraft

 Boeing B-17 Flying Fortress (1943–1945)
 North American AT-6 Texan (1947–1949)
 Beechcraft AT-11 Kansan (1947–1949)
 Curtiss C-46 Commando (1949)
 Douglas C-47 Skytrain (1949)
 Douglas B-26 Marauder (1949)
 North American F-86 Sabre (1954–1956)
 North American F-100 Super Sabre (1957, 1963–1964)
 Republic F-105 Thunderchief (1963–1972)
 McDonnell F-4 Phantom II (1975–1989)
 Boeing T-43 Bobcat (1993–1996, 1999–2010)

Awards and campaigns

See also

 B-17 Flying Fortress units of the United States Army Air Forces
 List of F-86 Sabre units
 List of F-100 units of the United States Air Force 
 List of F-105 units of the United States Air Force 
 List of F-4 Phantom II operators

References

Notes
 Explanatory notes

 Citations

Bibliography

 
 
 
 
 
 
 
 
 

0563
Military units and formations disestablished in 2010